Saad El-Din Samir Saad Ali, simply known as Saad Samir, (born 1 April 1989) is an Egyptian footballer who plays as a defender for Future on loan from Al Ahly. He has competed at the 2012 Summer Olympics.

In May 2018 he was named in Egypt's preliminary squad for the 2018 FIFA World Cup in Russia.

Honours and achievements

Club
Al Ahly
 Egyptian Premier League: 2009–10, 2013–14, 2015–16, 2016–17, 2017–18, 2018–19 , 2019-20
 Egypt Cup: 2017, 2019–20
 Egyptian Super Cup: 2011, 2014, 2015, 2017, 2018
 CAF Champions League: 2012, 2013, 2019–20, 2020-21
 CAF Confederation Cup: 2014
 CAF Super Cup: 2013, 2014
 FIFA Club World Cup: Third-Place 2020

References

External links
 
 
 
 

1989 births
Living people
Egyptian footballers
Egypt international footballers
Olympic footballers of Egypt
Footballers at the 2012 Summer Olympics
Al Ahly SC players
Al Mokawloon Al Arab SC players
Al Masry SC players
2017 Africa Cup of Nations players
Egyptian Premier League players
Footballers from Cairo
Association football central defenders
2018 FIFA World Cup players
Future FC (Egypt) players